is a railway station in the city of Iiyama, Nagano Prefecture, Japan operated by East Japan Railway Company (JR East).

Lines
Kuwanagawa Station is served by the Iiyama Line, and is 37.6 kilometers from the starting point of the line at Toyono Station.

Station layout
The station consists of one ground-level island platform connected to the station building by a level crossing. The station is normally unattended, but is staffed during the winter ski season.

Platforms

History
Kuwanagawa Station opened on 6 July 1923. With the privatization of Japanese National Railways (JNR) on 1 April 1987, the station came under the control of JR East. A new station building was completed in 2009.

Surrounding area
Chikuma River

See also
 List of railway stations in Japan

References

External links

 JR East station information 

Railway stations in Nagano Prefecture
Iiyama Line
Railway stations in Japan opened in 1923
Iiyama, Nagano